Eccellenza Basilicata is the regional Eccellenza football division for clubs in the Southern Italian region of Basilicata, Italy. It is competed among 16 teams, in one group. The winners of the Groups are promoted to Serie D. The club who finishes second also have the chance to gain promotion, they are entered into a national play-off which consists of two rounds.

Champions
Here are the past champions of the Basilicata Eccellenza, organised into their respective seasons.

1991–92 Vultur Rionero  	   	
1992–93 Melfi  	
1993–94 Invicta Potenza
1994–95 Melfi  	
1995–96 Sporting Villa D'Agri 	  	
1996–97 Lagonegro 	  	
1997–98 Policoro 	  	
1998–99 Ferrandina 	  								  	
1999–2000 Materasassi	
2000–01 Pisticci 	  	
2001–02 ASC Potenza
2002–03 Bernalda 	  	
2003–04 Lavello	  	
2004–05 Francavilla sul Sinni
2005–06 Sporting Genzano
2006–07 Horatiana Venosa
2007–08 Sporting Genzano
2008–09 Pisticci
2009–10 Fortis Murgia
2010–11 Angelo Cristofaro
2011–12 Atletico Potenza
2012–13 Real Metapontino
2013–14 Rossoblu Potenza
2014–15 AZ Picerno
2015–16 Vultur Rionero
2016–17 Real Metapontino
2017–18 Rotonda
2018–19 Grumentum Val d'Agri
2019–20 Lavello
2020–21 Not assigned
2021–22 Matera Grumentum

References

External links
Some Club Histories In the League

Sport in Basilicata
Bas
Sports leagues established in 1991
1991 establishments in Italy
Football clubs in Italy
Association football clubs established in 1991